Bhaur is a mountain range located in the Kalat District of Balochistan, Pakistan. It is located at 29°22'60N 67°20'60 E.

References

Mountain ranges of Balochistan (Pakistan)